Eros, o Deus do Amor (English: Eros, the god of love) is a 1981 Brazilian erotic drama film written and directed by Walter Hugo Khouri. The film focuses on Marcelo, a wealthy but philandering businessman who recounts several women that formed his sexuality as he longs to find purpose in life.

Plot 
Wealthy Italian-Brazilian businessman Marcelo lives lavishly with his wife Eleonora and their daughter Berenice. His marriage with Eleonora is hostile due to him cheating on her with several women over the years. He meets art gallery curator Ana; despite having a boyfriend and being significantly younger than him, Ana is seduced by Marcelo to become his mistress.

Ana becomes curious about Marcelo's past and how he views love, so Marcelo recounts to Ana all the women he had been sexually attracted to over the years. He recalls being close to his mother and having an unfulfilled incestuous crush towards her. During his time as an adolescent in 1945, Marcelo lusts after his English tutor, Miss Collins, who shows skin provocatively while teaching him. He later spies on Miss Collins pleasuring herself from reading erotica before catching him; the aroused Collins proceeds to take his virginity despite his young age. Years before as a child in 1935, he encounters and becomes drawn to the leader of a Communist group fleeing the authorities and follows her to their hideout at an old castle. Later on, he finds the family house servant Lígia eating in the barnhouse with her clothing barely on; she decides to fully strip naked in front of the young Marcelo.

Marcelo becomes philanderous and promiscuous as an adult, causing him to neglect his family. He carries out his affairs with several women at his private penthouse on the top floor of his company, which is a family-inherited conglomerate. He admits, however, he is often underwhelmed by them and rarely gives him satisfaction. Berenice, now college-aged, comes upon her parents threatening divorce over Marcelo's infidelity. Berenice strikes a conversation with her father, who disapproves over her choice in rejecting her privileged background to go into social work. Berenice laments their deteriorating relationship, noting that he is still aimless in life and has not changed from his perverted ways, even seducing students from her school. However, Marcelo begins lustfully ogling at his daughter, which she notices and dismisses as an observance of her weight. Berenice shares that she could not describe what he looks like, alluding to his duplicitous and dishonest ways.

Ana is disheartened from Marcelo's callous disregard towards his former lovers, and realizes that he wants a woman who is the culmination of all the women he had lusted after. Knowing she could never fully fulfill his desires, Ana breaks up with him. He tries to win her back but she rejects him when she notices him staring at another woman while they are speaking. Marcelo decides to begin dating the woman, an actress also named Ana. He later visits Ana on the set of her movie, set in the castle where he had followed the Communists as a child; there, he hallucinates another actress as the Communist leader. He has a final childhood flashback of him and his mother watching an aggressive caged bear at a zoo.

Cast 
Roberto Maya as Marcelo, a 48 year-old wealthy businessman and owner of a family-owned empire, and the film's narrator and primary point-of-view, with the story being told through his perspective. He has several sexual experiences during his formative childhood years which led to his promiscuous ways as an adult. His countless affairs strains his relationships with his wife Eleonora and daughter Berenice. His hypersexuality leads to his attraction to several women that he encounters, including incestuous attractions towards his mother and daughter.
Denise Dumont as Ana, an art gallery worker who is Marcelo's mistress during the film's events. She meets Marcelo when he visits her art gallery and, despite already having a boyfriend, she is seduced into having an affair with him. She is significantly younger than him, with her observing that Marcelo is even older than her mother.
Dina Sfat as Marcelo's mother, with whom Marcelo had a close relationship with and had a one-sided incestuous attraction towards.
Lilian Lemmertz as Eleonora, Marcelo's scorned wife and Berenice's mother. She often argues with her husband over his affairs despite him denying them. She is ironically the only woman in the film that is not seen in a sexual way by Marcelo.
Lala Deheinzelin as Berenice, Marcelo and Eleonora's daughter. She is a college student who wants to pursue social work and philanthropy to help underprivileged people, which contrasts with her father's uncaring nature. She was close with her father as a child, however their relationship had been strained after finding out about Marcelo cheating on her mom with several women including her schoolmates. She is later leered at by her father when she wears a revealing swimsuit.
Norma Bengell as Ada, a former lover of Marcelo who tries to ask money from him
Maria Cláudia as Annelise, an astronomer who was one of Marcelo's former lovers
Renée de Vielmond as Ana, a leader of a Communist group that Marcelo encounters as a child. She is referred as "Ana III" in the credits.
Christiane Torloni as Ana, a young actress who becomes Marcelo's girlfriend by the film's conclusion. She is referred as "Ana II" in the credits.
Kate Lyra as Miss Collins, Marcelo's nymphomaniac English teacher who took his virginity and molested him as an adolescent.
Alvamar Taddei as Lígia, a house servant of Marcelo's family who undressed in front of Marcelo when he was a child.
Nicole Puzzi as Berenice, one of Marcelo's former lovers who had been with him for seven years. She was a young teenaged student who was unfamiliar with sex when she began her relationship with Marcelo; during her affair with him, she becomes more free-spirited. She also noted that she shares the same name as Marcelo's daughter, who was two years old during their affair. She is referred as "Berenice II" in the credits.
Patrícia Scalvi as Renata, a prostitute who had sex with Marcelo alongside Lilit
Monique Lafond as Lilit, a prostitute who had sex with Marcelo alongside Renata
Serafim Gonzalez as Léo, the director of Ana's film
Suely Aoki as Midouri, a woman Marcelo has sex with during a visit to Japantown
Kate Hansen as a sculptor who becomes one of Marcelo's former lovers
Dorothée-Marie Bouvier as Ruth, a teacher of Marcelo who taught his class about Eros, the god of love
Selma Egrei as one of Marcelo's former lovers, who likes masochism

Awards 
São Paulo Association of Art Critics Awards
Best Picture
Best Actress (Tied with Norma Bengell, Renée de Vielmond and Dina Sfat) 
Best Director (Walter Hugo Khouri)

References

External links 
 

1981 films
1980s Portuguese-language films
Brazilian drama films
Films directed by Walter Hugo Khouri
Best Picture APCA Award winners
1981 drama films
Incest in film